Arivaca albicostella is a species of snout moth. It is found in the US in southern Florida.

The forewings are reddish brown, often sprinkled with light brown and dark brown scales. The color is light brown anterior to the cell, sometimes sprinkled rather heavily with darker scales. The hindwings are light brown.

References

Moths described in 1917
Anerastiini
Moths of North America